Georgia Woodward (born 21 May 1992) is an Australian producer and actress. Woodward is most known for her starring role as Charlotte on the hit online series, A Shared House.

Early life 
Georgia Woodward was born in Sydney, Australia to music teachers Tanya and Colin Woodward. She has a sister, Amy Woodward. She grew up in Manly on Sydney's Northern Beaches. She graduated from Cromer Campus in 2009. During school Woodward attended acting classes at the National Institute of Dramatic Art (NIDA). After graduating high school, Woodward began studying an Acting Degree at Sydney Theatre School. Whilst at the school, Woodward began collaborating with Joshua Lundberg on the online sitcom A Shared House. Woodward decided to drop out of her degree to focus on the series.

Woodward is a trained short and long form improviser. She trained at Laugh Masters Academy, a Chicago style improvisational comedy school in Sydney.

Career 

In 2021, Woodward was appointed as a Development Producer at Southern Pictures, a factual production company based in Sydney, Australia.
This appointment was supported through Screen Australia Enterprise People Program.

Barking Mouse (formerly Hustle Productions) 
Woodward and director, Joshua Lundberg launched their production company, Hustle Productions in July 2016 after the success of A Shared House.

In 2018, Hustle Productions relaunched as Barking Mouse. 
Woodward continues to work as a producer.

A Shared House 
In 2014, Woodward starred in Joshua Lundberg's short film Unmanned. The two worked well together and in January 2015 Woodward approached Lundberg about her interest in creating a comedy series. "I was inspired by Amy Poehler and Tina Fey who created their own opportunities in the entertainment industry". The series was produced on a small budget and was made up of a cast and crew who worked on it because they "loved the writing".

A Shared House was released on YouTube on Friday 13 November 2015. On its first weekend A Shared House struggled with views as it was released on the same day as the November 2015 Paris attacks.

The series received international critical acclaim. It was titled 'The Best Web Series of 2015' by online critic Web Series 2 Watch (What U Want 2 Watch) and given a 9/10 Rating by The AU Review.

Lundberg and Woodward announced pre-production for Season 2 in February 2016 .

A Shared House earned Woodward an Outstanding Actress in Comedy Series Award Nomination at the 2016 Los Angeles Web Series Festival at Warner Brothers Studios in California. The series was nominated for another three awards at the festival and took home the Outstanding Writing in a Comedy Series award.

Awards and nominations

A Shared House (Series)

Los Angeles Web Series Festival

Nominee: Outstanding Actress in a Comedy Series

Winner: Outstanding Actress in a Comedy Series

NYC Web Festival

Nominee: Best International Series -  A Shared House

Nominee: Best Ensemble Cast - A Shared House

Nominee: Best Dramedy - A Shared House

Staying the Night (Short film)

Mardi Gras Film Festival

Winner: Audience Award for Best Short Film

References

External links 
 
 A Shared House

1992 births
Living people
Australian television actresses